USS Daffodil was a side-wheel steamer in the United States Navy.

Daffodil was built as Jonas Smith by B. C. Terry at Keyport, New Jersey, in 1862. She was purchased at New York 17 November 1862 and fitted out at New York Navy Yard.

Service record
Assigned to duty with the South Atlantic Blockading Squadron, Daffodil sailed 24 November 1862, Acting Master L. G. Crane in command. From her arrival at Port Royal, South Carolina on 10 December 1862 until the end of the war she served as tug in the coastal waters of South Carolina and Georgia. Her services were characterized by Admiral Samuel Francis Du Pont as invaluable. On 8 September 1863 she towed 25 of the boats in the assault on Fort Sumter. From 27 November to 29 December 1864 she took part in the successful Army-Navy expedition up Broad River to destroy the Charleston and Savannah Railroad Bridge near Pocotaligo, South Carolina. On 27 January 1865 she made a reconnaissance up the Ashepoo River and on 9 February joined in a successful engagement with enemy batteries in the Togodo River.

Prizes

Officers assigned

Post war
After the American Civil War Daffodil joined the newly organized North Atlantic Squadron and was stationed at Port Royal, South Carolina, until sold at Savannah, Georgia on 13 March 1867.

Notes

References

Porter, David D. The Naval History of the Civil War Castle, Secaucus, NJ, 1984, .
Silverstone, Paul H. Warships of the Civil War Navies Naval Institute Press,Annapolis, MD, 1989, .

Steamships of the United States Navy
Ships built in Keyport, New Jersey
Ships of the Union Navy